Terry Phelps (born December 18, 1966) is a former professional women's tennis player who is best known for reaching the quarterfinals of the French Open in 1985. She reached No. 20 in the world rankings on May 26, 1986, her career high.

Career finals

Singles (2 runner-ups)

Grand Slam singles performance timeline

References

External links
 
 

1966 births
American female tennis players
Living people
People from Larchmont, New York
Tennis people from New York (state)
21st-century American women